Tina Benko is an American actress and acting teacher known for her roles in film, theatre, and television.

Early life 
Benko was born in Pittsburgh, Pennsylvania.

Career 
Benko was nominated for a Lucille Lortel Award for her portrayal of Jacqueline Kennedy Onassis in Elfriede Jelinek's solo work Jackie in 2013 at the New York City Center. She won the St. Clair Bayfield Award for playing Titania in Julie Taymor's production of A Midsummer Night's Dream at Theatre for a New Audience.  In 2019 she appeared in the off-Broadway play Eureka Day

Benko teaches at HB Studio and Fordham University. Benko also narrated Peter de Jonge's novel Shadows Still Remain.

Filmography

Film

Television

References

External links

Living people
1971 births
Actresses from Pittsburgh
American film actresses
American television actresses
American stage actresses
Fordham University faculty
Acting teachers
American women academics
21st-century American women